Michael Thomas Dorreen (born 19 January 1967) is a New Zealand former professional rugby league footballer who played in the 1980s and 1990s.

New Zealand
Dorreen played for the dominating Canterbury provincial side of the early 1990s alongside Quentin Pongia, Logan Edwards, Whetu Taewa and coach Frank Endacott. In 1994, he changed regions and joined the Hawkes Bay Unicorns for the inaugural Lion Red Cup. He also made the New Zealand Residents side in 1994 and played two games for the New Zealand national rugby league team.

Australian competition
In 1995, he joined the new Auckland Warriors franchise in the Australian Rugby League. He played in 14 matches for the new club but was not re-signed for 1996. In 1996, he moved to Sydney to play for the Sydney Tigers. He then finished his professional career with the Hunter Mariners in the Super League competition. He played for Orange in 1998.

He returned to New Zealand in 1999, playing for Halswell and Canterbury.

Coaching career
In 2007, he was to coach the Canterbury under-18 side with his former teammate Logan Edwards before the competition was canceled by the New Zealand Rugby League. However, they have continued to be involved in age grade coaching in Canterbury and, in 2009, they coached the Canterbury Bulls under-18 side.

In 2010, Dorreen coached the South Island under 17 side in the National Zonal Competition.

In 2012, he was promoted to head coach of the South Island side. In 2013, the Canterbury Bulls replaced the South Island Scorpions in the National Competition and Dorreen became the Canterbury Bulls' head coach.

References

New Zealand national rugby league team players
New Zealand rugby league coaches
New Zealand rugby league players
Canterbury rugby league team players
Hawke's Bay rugby league team players
New Zealand Warriors players
Balmain Tigers players
Hunter Mariners players
1967 births
Living people
Halswell Hornets players
Addington Magpies players
Rugby league wingers
Rugby league centres
South Island rugby league team coaches
Canterbury rugby league team coaches